Ella and Nelia Casella (1858-1946 and 1859-1950) were British artists, sculptors, and medalists, known for their collaborative work. Both sisters worked frequently in wax, creating portraits which are now held by the Victoria and Albert Museum. They worked together on a variety of illustrations and medal commissions.

Career 
Ella (3 January 1858 – 3 September 1946) and Nelia Casella (23 July 1859 – 29 April 1950) studied at the Slade School of Art under the tutelage of Alphonse Legros.

Commissions to the sisters were usually answered in correspondence by 'Miss Casella' and so it is difficult to know which sister was the correspondent.

Jackson-Gwilt Medal
In 1895, the Casella sisters were commissioned by the Royal Astronomical Society to create the medal for the Jackson-Gwilt Prize in Astronomy.

Artwork

Ella Casella 

 Relief of St. George and the Dragon, 1897, Victoria and Albert Museum
 Woman in Renaissance Costume, 1890-1900, Victoria and Albert Museum
 Stained holly wood box, 1900, Victoria and Albert Museum
Euterpe, 1901

Nelia Casella 

 Gilt and enamel bottle, 1892, Victoria and Albert Museum
 Man in Renaissance Costume, 1899, Victoria and Albert Museum
 Illustrations to Percy Pitt's score for Cinderella, 1900
 Boy Holding a Rose, 1903, Victoria and Albert Museum
 Carnations, 1907, Victoria and Albert Museum
 Silvia Bella, 1908, Victoria and Albert Museum
 Dante

Joint work by the Casella sisters 

 Illustrations for 'Dreams, Dances and Disappointments' (1881) and 'The Maypole' (1882) by Gertrude A. Konstam
 The Charcot Medal, late 19th Century, examples in: Victoria and Albert Museum, British Museum
 The Jackson-Gwilt Medal, 1897
 Italian Renaissance Lady and Gentleman

References

19th-century English women artists
20th-century English women artists
Alumni of the Slade School of Fine Art
Artists from London
British numismatists
Exonumia
Medallists
Sibling artists
Sister duos
Women numismatists